Monty M. Denneau is a computer architect and mathematician. Denneau was awarded the 2002 Seymour Cray Computer Engineering Award for "ingenious and sustained contributions to designs and implementations at the frontier of high performance computing leading to widely used industrial products."

Denneau currently works for IBM, where he is the chief system architect for the Cyclops64 family of supercomputers. In 2013, he was named an IBM Fellow, the company's highest technical honor.

References 

Living people
Seymour Cray Computer Engineering Award recipients
IBM employees
Year of birth missing (living people)